"All Around Me" is a song by American band Flyleaf from their self-titled debut album, Flyleaf (2005). It was released as the third single on April 23, 2007. It is the band's highest-charting and only single to chart on the Billboard Hot 100 and their most successful single to date.

Eventually, it became a mainstream and modern rock hit in the United States, crossing over to the pop charts, where it reached No. 40 on the Billboard Hot 100. The song took a large leap into the top 40 channels, receiving more than 20 new stations in just a single day. The song was certified Platinum in the U.S. on January 22, 2010, selling over 1,000,000 copies.

Music video
The music video for the song was directed by Paul Fedor. In it, the band is dressed in white except lead singer Lacey Mosley, who is wearing a grey dress. The walls have red, yellow, blue, green, and black paint running down them and later in the video the paint is on the band.

The video provides a different version of the song, which includes an extra refrain in the second chorus, totaling a duration of 3 minutes and 34 seconds as opposed to the album version at 3 minutes and 18 seconds.

The video debuted on Fuse TV's Oven Fresh on June 25, 2007, and on Yahoo! Music on June 28, 2007.

Track listing

Charts
Beginning its run on the Mainstream Rock Chart, it peaked at No. 20 in August 2007, while reaching No. 6 on the Alternative chart in October 2007. In June 2008, it reached the top 40 on the Billboard Hot 100 and the top 20 on the Pop Songs.

Certifications

Awards
2009 BMI Pop Award Winning Song

Other versions
David Crowder Band recorded a cover version of the song for their album Church Music. Skillet performed a live acoustic cover of "All Around Me" on November 20, 2009, in Dallas, Texas.

References

2005 songs
2007 singles
A&M Octone Records singles
Flyleaf (band) songs
Song recordings produced by Howard Benson